Emamzadeh Abdollah Rural District is a rural district (dehestan) in Dehferi District, Fereydunkenar County, Mazandaran Province, Iran. At the 2006 census, its population was 17,097, in 4,494 families. The rural district has 19 villages.

References 

Rural Districts of Mazandaran Province
Fereydunkenar County